Thomas Harris (1895 – 18 February 1974) was an Irish Fianna Fáil politician. A native of Cloncurry, he was raised in Prosperous, County Kildare by his aunt Elizabeth Tierney. 

As a young man he joined Conradh na Gaeilge in Prosperous, and subsequently joined the Irish Republican Brotherhood. Harris fought with the Maynooth contingent in 1916 Easter Rising in Dublin. He was captain of the Prosperous Company in 1917 and later Vice-Commandant North Kildare Battalion of the Irish Republican Army in 1921.

A farmer, Harris was first elected to the Kildare constituency in a by-election in June 1931 caused by the death of Labour Party TD, Hugh Colohan. With just over 40% of the vote Harris defeated Cumann na nGaedheal candidate John Curton and future Labour Party leader, William Norton. He served as a member of Dáil Éireann for the next 26 years representing the constituencies of Kildare from 1931 to 1937, Carlow–Kildare from 1937 to 1948, and Kildare again from 1948 to 1957. He lost his seat at the 1957 general election and retired from politics.

Harris was related to Matthew Harris, MP for Galway East from 1885 to 1890.

References

1895 births
1974 deaths
Fianna Fáil TDs
Members of the 6th Dáil
Members of the 7th Dáil
Members of the 8th Dáil
Members of the 9th Dáil
Members of the 10th Dáil
Members of the 11th Dáil
Members of the 12th Dáil
Members of the 13th Dáil
Members of the 14th Dáil
Members of the 15th Dáil
Politicians from County Kildare
Irish farmers
People from Maynooth